The 1989 LPGA Tour was the 40th season since the LPGA Tour officially began in 1950. The season ran from January 13 to November 5. The season consisted of 33 official money events. Betsy King won the most tournaments, six. She also led the money list with earnings of $654,132.

There were seven first-time winners in 1989: Tina Barrett, Elaine Crosby, Allison Finney, Lori Garbacz, Tammie Green, Robin Hood, and Dottie Mochrie.

The tournament results and award winners are listed below.

Tournament results
The following table shows all the official money events for the 1989 season. "Date" is the ending date of the tournament. The numbers in parentheses after the winners' names are the number of wins they had on the tour up to and including that event. Majors are shown in bold.

Awards

References

External links
LPGA Tour official site
1989 season coverage at golfobserver.com

LPGA Tour seasons
LPGA Tour